is a song recorded by Japanese singers Milet, Aimer, and Lilas Ikuta. It was released on December 17, 2021, through The First Take Music, as The First Take second collaboration project after Lisa and Uru's "Saikai". Written and produced by Vaundy, the song expresses the good feeling of facing yourself and the people.

The song accompanied Sony's wireless noise-canceling earphones WF-1000XM4 advertisement, starring the singers and first launched on November 4. The live performance on the YouTube channel The First Take was premiered on the same day as the release date. Vaundy's self-cover version of "Omokage" was included in his first EP Hadaka no Yūsha (2022). The singers and Vaundy gave a televised debut performance of the song at 73rd NHK Kōhaku Uta Gassen on December 31, 2022.

Charts

Weekly charts

Year-end charts

Certifications

Release history

References

2021 singles
2021 songs
Japanese-language songs